Boynedale is a rural locality in the Gladstone Region, Queensland, Australia.

Geography 
The Lake Awoonga  is part of the northern boundary of the locality. It is the impoundment of the Boyne River by the Awoonga Dam.

History 
The locality takes its name from the Boyne River, which in turn was named on 14 November 1823 by Surveyor-General John Oxley on the cutter HM Mermaid.

The Gladstone to Monto railway line opened its  first section from Byellee (previously known as Boyne Valley Junction) to Many Peaks was opened on 25 July 1910 with Boynedale railway station serving the Boynedale locality. The station closed on 8 December 1997. The line closed to regular services in 2002 with the final train on the line being a steam special run from Monto to Maryborough in 2005.

The locality was officially named and bounded on 27 August 1999.

Heritage listings 
Boynedale has a number of heritage-listed sites, including:
 Glengarry Homestead, Gladstone–Monto Road

Education 
There are no schools in Boynedale. The nearest government primary school is Nagoorin State School in Nagoorin in the neighbouring Boyne Valley to the south. The nearest government secondary school is Gladstone State High School in West Gladstone to the north.

Calliope State High School in Calliope to the north opened in 2020 and will offer secondary education to Year 10 from 2022 and to Year 12 from 2024. Once fully operational, it will be closer than Gladstone State High School.

See also 

 List of schools in Central Queensland

References

Gladstone Region
Localities in Queensland